The Christmas Pig is a Christmas fairy tale novel by J. K. Rowling and illustrated by Jim Field. The story was published in October 2021. Upon release, the book received positive critical reviews and emerged a bestseller with high pre-sales on Amazon.

Plot
On their way back from buying a replacement tree angel on Christmas Eve, Jack's step sister Holly throws his beloved childhood toy DP (Dur Pig) out of the car window onto the motorway during a row. His grandparents try to recover the toy but to no avail. That night, Grandpa and Holly buy a replacement they named Christmas Pig but Jack threw the replacement aside out of grief for the lost toy. Later that night, Jack sees his toys come to life and Christmas Pig offers to lead Jack to recover DP saying miracles happen on Christmas Eve. Jack shrinks and he and Christmas Pig get lost under the Christmas tree sending them to Mislaid where lost objects are sorted into different towns in the Land of the Lost. Jack slips past the guards while Christmas Pig distracts them convincing the other lost things that he is an action figure called Pyjama Boy. Jack and Christmas Pig are first sent to Disposable, a town for easily replaceable objects. They then hide inside a lunchbox with an inhaler inside who is adjusted to the more upscale town of Bother-It's-Gone on account of the owner's mother being concerned about the inhaler. In Bother-It's-Gone, the law enforcements are alerted to Jack and Christmas Pig's presence, but they find a hiding place where a compass leads them into the Wastes of the Unlamented where the Land's ruler, the Loser who makes people lose things whose enlivened parts (souls) end up in the Land of the Lost, hunts the unlamented but the protagonists get away. Jack and Christmas Pig, who Jack now calls CP, find their way to the City of Missed where they meet lost emotions represented as personifications. They are sent to a palace where they meet a king called Power who tries to turn Jack over to the Loser, who wanted to eat a real person, despite the principles branding it as murder. Fortunately, Hope manages to help Jack and CP escape and fly them to the Island of the Beloved, where the Loser cannot come nor harm any of the Islands residents who are immortal. There, Jack meets his beloved DP and the original tree angel. After being able to say a proper goodbye to DP, whose physical body was destroyed on the motorway, and being assured he and the angel are happy there, Jack wanted to recover CP, who did not land on the Island with him. Santa Claus, who has a home on the Island, flies Jack to the Wastes of the Unlamented where Compass leads him to the Loser's Lair where CP and the replacement tree angel are caged awaiting the Loser eating their enlivened parts which would make their physical bodies back in the Land of the Living, on the surface, disappear. Jack reaches CP and after a conversation with the Loser, the caged things rise to the surface after being found along with Jack. Back in his living room and returned to his normal size, Jack's family, who noticed his disappearance, are relieved he is safe and Holly promises not to bully him again, believing his story about the Land of the Lost. Going to bed, Jack wished CP goodnight and CP wished him goodnight in return.

Background
Rowling's ideas for The Christmas Pig first originated in 2012. She had always wanted to write a Christmas story, and was inspired by a pair of toy pigs her son had as a young child. She completed writing the book in 2020 during the COVID-19 pandemic. Rowling said that, due to the pandemic, "I was unusually aware of the need for human connection. I think that's why I kept imagining it being read aloud while working on it, something I've never done with any other book." She described the story as "about being lost and being found, about loving and being loved, about what stays with us and what falls away. It's also about hope and endurance."

The Christmas Pig is illustrated by Jim Field.

Release and reception
The Christmas Pig was published by Hachette Children's Group in the UK, Australia, New Zealand, Ireland and India, and by Scholastic in the US and Canada. It was the number one bestseller on its first week on sale in the UK, selling 60,010 copies, the 16th book of Rowling's to reach number one in its first week. The novel also topped The New York Timess children's middle grade hardcover bestseller list.

The Times called the book a "wonderful, timely" story. The New York Times stated, "Rowling has written a marvelously persuasive fantasy for our times, one that looks back to the past in its determination to enlighten and console." The Evening Standard called it "her best since Azkaban".

References

2021 children's books
British fantasy novels
Christmas novels
Novels by J. K. Rowling
Books about pigs